Namuggala Kagali was Kabaka of the Kingdom of Buganda, between 1741 and 1750. He was the twenty-fourth (24th) Kabaka of Buganda.

Claim to the throne
He was the second son of Prince Musanje Golooba. His mother was Nabulya Naluggwa of the Ndiga clan, the second of his father's wives. He ascended to the throne upon the death of his elder brother, Kabaka Mwanga I Sebanakitta, in 1741. He established his capital at Nansana.

Married life
He is recorded to have married six (6) wives:

 Naabakyaala Basuuta, the Kaddulubaale, daughter Masembe, of the Nsenene clan
 Najjuka, daughter of Gunju, of the Butiko clan
 Nakangu, daughter of Kagenda, of the Mamba clan
 Nalubowa, daughter of Seggiriinya, of the Ngo (Leopard) clan.
 Nalunga, daughter of Terwewalwa, of the Nvuma clan.
 Nawaguma, daughter of Kisuule, of the Tembo? clan

Issue
He is recorded to have fathered three sons:

 Prince (Omulangira) Kateregga, whose mother was Basuuta
 Prince (Omulangira) Ngabo, whose mother was Najjuka
 Prince (Omulangira) Kiboli, whose mother was Nawaguma

The final years

Kabaka Namuggala abdicated in favor of his younger brother, Kyabaggu Kabinuli, around 1750. He died, following an accidental fall on Nalubugo Hill, after his abdication. He was buried at Muyomba, Busiro.

Succession table

See also
 Kabaka of Buganda
 Nansana

References

External links
List of the Kings of Buganda

Kabakas of Buganda
18th-century monarchs in Africa
Deaths from falls